"Peter's Got Woods" is the 11th episode and the mid-season premiere of the fourth season of the American animated television series Family Guy. It originally aired on Fox in the United States on September 11, 2005. In the episode, Brian offers to help an African-American woman change the name of James Woods Regional High School to Martin Luther King Jr., but his friendship with Peter becomes strained when Peter — who objects to the idea —  recruits actor James Woods to sabotage the idea. James Woods would later return for revenge in the season 6 episode "Back to the Woods", and again for "Brian Griffin's House of Payne" and would eventually be killed off in the season 9 premiere episode "And Then There Were Fewer", but is later revealed to have survived his death in the season 10 episode "Tom Tucker: The Man and His Dream".

Directed by Peter Shin, Chuck Klein and Zac Moncrief and written by Danny Smith, the episode was initially scheduled for September 18, 2005, but was aired a week earlier due to Fox delaying the broadcast of the episode "Perfect Castaway" over sensitivity for Hurricane Katrina victims. It features guest performances from Gary Cole, Michael Dorn, Susana Esteban, Jonathan Frakes, Rachael MacFarlane, Patrick Stewart, Fred Tatasciore, Gabrielle Union, Wally Wingert, and James Woods, along with several recurring voice actors for the series. "Peter's Got Woods" was seen by approximately 9.22 million viewers during its original broadcast, and it received mostly positive reviews from critics.

Plot
Lois asks Peter to go to a PTA meeting in her place; Peter asks Brian to go in his place. Brian reluctantly attends, but he falls in love with one of Meg's teachers (played by Gabrielle Union) named Shauna Parks (a reference to Rosa Parks), who is black. They go out on a date, and Brian, attempting to win her over, suggests changing the name of James Woods Regional High School to honor Martin Luther King Jr. Shauna likes Brian's idea, and the board holds a meeting to consider the name change. However, Peter is a James Woods fan and sees through the trick. He tries to protest the idea, but Brian denies the fact that he is doing it for love and not to really honor the civil rights movement. As a James Woods fan, Peter brings James Woods himself to the school during the name-changing to sabotage the effort.

Woods permits them to change the name and the school, impressed by his humility, reinstates the name to the James Woods Regional High School. Brian gets furious with Peter for sabotaging the attempt to change the name of the high school and continues his denial of just wanting to impress his girlfriend because of her race. However, Peter exposes Brian and points out the ruse by saying that Brian could have named it after Ronald Reagan rather than anybody from the civil rights movement. In reply to this, Brian and Peter end their friendship.

To replace Brian as a friend, Peter becomes BFFs with Woods and the two spend their days giving gifts, sculpting themselves up with trees, riding bikes, camping in the backyard, wrestling in their tent like two children, etc. During this, Peter and Woods sing a parody of "You Two" from Chitty Chitty Bang Bang.

One day during a date at the movie theater, Brian is forced to admit to Shauna that he is still loyal to Peter. Shauna, however, hates Peter for sabotaging them and makes Brian choose between her or Peter. Brian likewise chooses to remain loyal to Peter and they break up. Noticing the situation, Mayor Adam West, as a joke, offers Brian popcorn to cheer him up, but Brian sees cream corn in the popcorn bag.

When Brian comes back home, he sees that his life has been given to James Woods. Woods sleeps on the bed with Peter and Lois, Peter and Woods now play fetch with each other, and they act as if they do not see Brian as their friend or relative anymore. Over time, Peter and Brian get bored without each other and they decide to reconcile. However, Peter notices that Woods has become obsessive with their friendship, he goes into a tirade at Peter for missing 5 minutes of a dinner. To rid themselves of Woods for good, Peter and Brian plant a trap baited with pieces of Reese's peanut candy ending in a crate. The plan works and Woods ends up being locked up in a crate, which according to Peter is later examined by "top men".

Production

The episode was written by Danny Smith and was directed by Peter Shin, Chuck Klein, and Zac Moncrief before the conclusion of the fourth production season. The episode was initially scheduled for September 18, 2005 but was aired a week earlier due to FOX delaying the broadcast of the episode "Perfect Castaway" over sensitivity for Hurricane Katrina victims, as the episode made many jokes about tropical storms. Although most episodes of Family Guy are rated TV-14, "Peter's Got Woods" was rated TV-PG.

In addition to the regular cast, actors Gary Cole, Michael Dorn, Susana Esteban, Jonathan Frakes, Rachael MacFarlane, Patrick Stewart, Fred Tatasciore, Gabrielle Union, Wally Wingert, and James Woods. In a cutaway of Star Trek: The Next Generation, actors Patrick Stewart, Jonathan Frakes, and Michael Dorn reprised their roles of Captain Picard, Commander Riker, and Lt. Commander Worf respectively. Recurring guest voices include Alex Breckenridge, Mike Henry, John Viener, and Adam West, who portrays an exaggerated version of himself.

Marina Sirtis, also of Star Trek: The Next Generation, was also cast in the episode reprising her role of Counselor Deanna Troi. Her scene, however, was removed from the final cut and is only available on DVD bonus features.

Cultural references
The episode contains some cultural references. In a scene, the toilet that Barney Rubble used in the Flintstones was used in a comparison. Stewie is shown playing Marco Polo with Helen Keller. In a cutaway of Star Trek: The Next Generation, Patrick Stewart, Jonathan Frakes and Michael Dorn are seen making fun of Worf (or rather, Worf's cranial ridges). During the episode Stewie reads The Da Vinci Code. Peter and James Woods sing a song from the musical Chitty Chitty Bang Bang. In the scene where James Woods shows Peter his idea of "fun", he shows him a copy of Videodrome and points out his scenes in the movie. The phrase "tear down this wall" was parodied with Ronald Reagan punching a wall at a McDonald's repeatedly. Luring James Woods out with a trail of Reese's Pieces is a reference to E.T. the Extra-Terrestrial. The final scene with Peter repeating "top men" and Woods being stored away in a crate is a reference to Raiders of the Lost Ark. When Shauna introduces herself to Brian, the same a cappella doo-wop vocals that play in Ferris Bueller's Day Off when Jeanie Bueller (Jennifer Grey) introduces herself to a boy (Charlie Sheen) in police headquarters ("It's Jean but most guys call me Shauna") plays in the background.

Reception
This episode had 9.22 and 9.72 million viewers on its first airing, and its lead-out, American Dad!, won the hour among the 18-49 demographic. Ryan J. Budke of AOL's blog TV Squad gave this episode a favorable review.

References

External links
 

Family Guy (season 4) episodes
2005 American television episodes
Cultural depictions of Ronald Reagan
Cultural depictions of Martin Luther King Jr.